Let's Boogie is an album by Welsh rock and roll singer Shakin' Stevens, released in October 1987 by Epic Records. It peaked at number 59 on the UK Albums Chart.

Release and content
The album is split into a studio side and a live side. Of the five studio tracks, four were released as singles, all becoming Top-40 hits in the UK, with "What Do You Want to Make Those Eyes at Me For" charting the highest at number 5, which was his last Top-10 single until the re-entry of "Merry Christmas Everyone" in 2018.

The second side, titled 'The Hits Keep Coming...' is a medley of Stevens' previous hits, recorded live at the London Palladium on 7 December 1986. On the original release of the album, the individual songs are chaptered. However on the 2009 re-release of the album as part of The Epic Masters box set, the medley is listed in its 'correct' format as one 23-minute track. Also different on the 2009 release of the album is that "What Do You Want to Make Those Eyes at Me For" is the single mix of the song; the album version "was a re-recording with a change in producer and musicians".

Upon release in October, the album charted for one week at number 66. However, with the success of "What Do You Want to Make Those Eyes At Me For", the album re-entered the charts in December for six weeks, peaking at number 59.

Track listing

2009 bonus tracks:

Personnel
Musicians

 Shakin' Stevens – vocals
Ian Aitken – lead guitar (2, 6–21)
Roger McKew – lead and rhythm guitar (6–21)
Dick Bland – bass guitar (6–21)
Gavin Povey – piano, synthesisers (6–21)
Chris Wyles – drums (3, 6–21)
The Rumour Brass:
Ray Beavis – tenor saxophone (6–21)
John "Irish" Earle – baritone and tenor saxophones (6–21)
Chris Gower – trombone (6–21)
Dick Hanson – trumpet (6–21)
Peter Van Hooke – drums (1)
Paul "Wix" Wickens – synthesisers (4)
Frank Ricotti – percussion (2)
Tony Rivers – backing vocals (3, 6–21)
Anthony Thompson – backing vocals (3, 6–21)
Mick Clarke – backing vocals (3, 6–21)
Marilyn David – backing vocals (1)
Sonia Jones – backing vocals (1)
Shirley Lewis – backing vocals (1)
London Gospel Choir members – backing vocals (5)
Technical

 Stuart Colman – producer (1, 5)
 Carey Taylor – producer (2)
 Shakin' Stevens – producer (2), executive producer (all tracks)
 Mike Leander – producer (3)
 John Springate – producer (3)
 Christopher Neil – producer (4)
 Track 1 recorded at Master Rock Studios, London
 Track 2 recorded at Maison Rouge, London
 Tracks 3 and 4 recorded at Mayfair Studios, London
 Track 5 recorded at Sarn Studios, London
 Tracks 6–21 recorded live by Manor Mobile

References

1987 albums
Epic Records albums
albums produced by Christopher Neil
Shakin' Stevens albums